DOA: Death of Amar is a 2014 Hindi-language Bollywood film. It Stars Rajeev Khandelwal, Zareen Khan and Prashant Narayanan. The film received its world premiere on 16 August 2014 as official selection at 22nd San Francisco Global Movie Fest and won the Audience Choice Award. The film was also awarded for Best Original Score. The film is produced by Remo D'Souza and directed by Param Gill. The story revolves around a struggling actor who is poisoned and has few hours to live. He must find out who killed him and why?

Cast 
Rajeev Khandelwal as Actor
Zareen Khan as Journalist 
Prashant Narayanan as Mafia Don
Murli Sharma as Cop

Soundtrack

References

External links 

 DOA: Death of Amar at Cinemalytics

2010s Hindi-language films